Anthony Jeffrey (born February 17, 1949), also known as Tonetta, is a Canadian singer-songwriter and visual artist who, in the early 1980s, began living as a recluse and recording original music on cassettes after separating from his wife. In 2008, he started his first YouTube channel, which led to his record label debut. His YouTube account, as well as many subsequent accounts established under other usernames, have been banned repeatedly for violating the site's content rules.

Life and career
Anthony Jeffrey was born on February 17, 1949, in the Cabbagetown neighbourhood of Toronto, Ontario, Canada.

Style and recognition
According to Jeffrey, "Tonetta" refers more specifically to his female alter ego. He said that many of his songs are inspired by real life people or incidents and cited John Lennon as his primary influence. Of his music tastes, he said: "I like the Beatles, Elvis Presley, Michael Jackson. I followed soul artists. ... After [Lennon] died, I didn't know who to follow anymore. It was around then I started writing anyway so it kinda worked out."

Critics have variously described Tonetta as "the savior of lo-fi music", "a pure artist", and a combination of "repulsion and intrigue".  In the description of music writer Johnny Dee, "For every YouTube comment that finds Tonetta hilarious or repellent there are dozens from people who have discovered that, beyond the shock value, is a genuine outsider pop artist." Tonetta is best known for his song "Pressure Zone". As of 2017, the music video was viewed over 2 million times on YouTube.

Jeffrey was interviewed on Season 5, Episode 14 of the American television series Tosh.0.  South California rock band the Growlers covered Tonetta's song, "Drugs, Drugs, Drugs", during various live performances, notably their 2012 Coachella setlist. Prior to reaching commercial success of their own, the Growlers had performed on stage with Tonetta, on February 18, 2011, at the Show Cave in Los Angeles.

Personal life 
As of 2011, Jeffrey lived in Toronto, Ontario, as a part-time upholsterer. He was previously married to a woman, until 1983, and has two sons. He has not talked to his wife or seen his children since 1983, when his sons were eight and 10 years old. One of his sons reconnected with him by email shortly after Jeffrey began posting music to YouTube in 2008, but stopped writing once Tonetta began "puttin’ on the dresses and stuff."

Discography

Studio albums
 777 (2010)
 777 Vol II (2010)
 777 Vol III (2011)
 Red Wine (2013)

Singles
 "Get It Going" b/w "Mmm Mama!" (2010)

References

External links
 

1949 births
Living people
Canadian male singer-songwriters
Canadian experimental musicians
Lo-fi musicians
Musicians from Toronto
Outsider musicians